Six Organs of Admittance is the first album release by experimental indie rock band, Six Organs of Admittance, released in 1998.

Track listing
"Maria"
"Sum of All Heaven"
"Shadow of a Dune"
"Harmonice Mundi II"
"Race for Vishnu"
"Invitation to the SR for Supper"
"Don't Be Afraid"

References

1998 debut albums
Six Organs of Admittance albums